Big Spring Creek may refer to:

 Big Spring Creek (Montana)
 Big Spring Creek (Pennsylvania)
 Big Spring Creek Falls, a three-tiered waterfall along Big Spring Creek, originating high on Mount Adams, Washington